Jean-Claude Perez (born 31 March 1964 in Carcassonne) is a French politician, and was a member of the National Assembly.  He represented Aude's 1st constituency 
from 1997 to 2017, as a member of the Socialist Party and of the Socialiste, radical, citoyen et divers gauche parliamentary group. He is the mayor of Carcassonne.

References

1964 births
Living people
People from Carcassonne
French people of Spanish descent
Socialist Party (France) politicians
Mayors of places in Occitania (administrative region)
Deputies of the 11th National Assembly of the French Fifth Republic
Deputies of the 12th National Assembly of the French Fifth Republic
Deputies of the 13th National Assembly of the French Fifth Republic
Deputies of the 14th National Assembly of the French Fifth Republic